Willow Creek Community Church is an Evangelical non-denominational, multi-site megachurch. Its largest campus is located in the northwestern Chicago suburb of South Barrington, Illinois. It was founded on October 12, 1975 by Dave Holmbo and Bill Hybels, who was its longtime senior pastor.  the church averaged 18,000 attendees each weekend at seven locations, down from a high of 25,000 in 2015. Willow Creek has seven locations in the Chicago area, and their Spanish-speaking congregation, Casa de Luz, meets at the South Barrington campus.

In 2018, the church's entire senior leadership and elder board resigned, admitting to having mishandled abuse allegations against Hybels. Steve Gillen, the longtime pastor of the church's North Shore campus, was named interim senior pastor in August 2018. In January 2020, it was announced that Gillen would step down in March and that the two candidates who were being considered for the role of senior pastor had been "released" from the search process. Dave Dummitt became senior pastor in June 2020.

History

Willow Creek Community Church started when Bill Hybels and Dave Holmbo were inspired by the success of the South Park Church's youth ministry, Son City, of which they were both leaders (Holmbo had invited Hybels to work with him a few years earlier), and aspired to start a church that used relevant biblical teaching, music, and drama. On October 12, 1975, the church met for the first time, renting Willow Creek Theater in Palatine, Illinois. Gilbert Bilezikian was Hybels' theological mentor. Bilezikian has been "credited with Willow Creek’s inclusion of women in its highest levels of leadership". In 1977, the church purchased  in South Barrington to build its own building. The first service was held in the new building in February 1981. The changes included a new worship center with more than 7,000 seats, which replaces the 4,500-seat Lakeside Auditorium.
 
On April 10, 2018, following allegations of sexual abuse, Bill Hybels announced his immediate resignation as senior pastor of the church; he had previously planned to retire in October of that year. Hybels, who denied the allegations, received a standing ovation from the church upon making this announcement.

In August 2018, Steve Gillen—the longtime pastor of the church's North Shore campus—was chosen as interim senior pastor. In January 2020, it was announced that Gillen would step down in March and that the two candidates who were being considered for the role of senior pastor had been "released" from the search process. In April 2020, the Elder Board of Willow Creek named Dave Dummitt as the new Senior Pastor.

Misconduct allegations and resignations
On March 23, 2018, the Chicago Tribune published an article detailing allegations of sexual misconduct by former Senior Pastor Bill Hybels spanning decades, including a prolonged affair with a married woman, though this was retracted by the woman herself. The Tribune wrote that elders of Willow Creek had conducted an internal review of Hybels' behavior which led to no findings of misconduct, leading to the resignations of at least three leaders of the Willow Creek Association’s board over what they believed to be an insufficient inquiry. All accusations have been denied by Hybels.

Hybels had planned to retire in October 2018 to focus his energy on the Willow Creek Association. On April 10, 2018, Hybels announced that he was resigning effective immediately and stated that he did not want to be a distraction to the church's ministry. He also announced he would leave the board of the Willow Creek Association and would no longer lead Willow Creek’s Global Leadership Summit.

On April 21, 2018, the Chicago Tribune and Christianity Today reported more misconduct allegations not included in the initial investigation. Church elders received reports of other unwanted sexual comments and advances by Hybels that not been previously investigated by the elder board. The elders indicated they would seek wise counsel and work with experts to investigate the allegations, developing a collaborative process.

On August 5, 2018, The New York Times reported extensively documented allegations of sexual misconduct against a tenth reported victim that were not included in any previous investigations or reports. Co-lead pastor Steve Carter resigned the same day. The entire elder board and co-lead pastor Heather Larson resigned on August 8, 2018 following a joint apology for mishandling the investigation.

On August 13, 2018, the Chicago Tribune reported the church had paid $3.25 million to settle two lawsuits over child sexual abuse by a church volunteer. Despite the settlements, the church denied any negligence in the two cases.

In September 2018, Willow Creek Community Church and Willow Creek Association announced the formation of what they called an "Independent Advisory Group" to investigate the numerous allegations against their founder. Religion News Service reported in December 2018 that the alleged misconduct and admitted mishandling of the allegations had led to a $3 million budget shortfall for 2018, the elimination of 50 full-time positions, a 9% reduction in attendance across all the church's campuses, and a reduction in attendance of at least 15% at its main South Barrington Campus.

A six-month independent review of the allegations against Hybels, conducted by four evangelical leaders engaged for that purpose and completed in February 2019, found Hybels' accusers credible.

In January 2020, the church announced that co-founder Gilbert Bilezikian had "engaged in inappropriate behavior" after a long time church member alleged he had sexually assaulted her a number of times between 1984 and 1988. Bilezikian denied the accusations and said the church had "violated the Bible's teaching on dealing with accusations against fellow Christians." The Elder Board of Willow Creek stated that it had restricted Bilezikian from serving within the church when allegations were brought against him in 2010; in 2015, however, he was honored as a "living legend" of the church. In January 2020, the Elder Response Team asserted that Bilezikian had been restricted from serving in the church, but added that he had continued to teach and serve in various capacities because "the restriction was not adequately communicated". In May 2020, Bilezikian filed a defamation lawsuit against the church.

Willow Creek Association
In 1992, the Willow Creek Association was founded. The WCA develops training and leadership conferences and resources for its member churches. The Willow Creek Association is often confused with Willow Creek Community Church, or mistaken for a denomination. However, it is a distinctly separate organization which has close affiliations with Willow Creek Community Church.

Since 1995, Willow Creek Association has held an annual leadership summit. Speakers at the summit have included President Bill Clinton.

The scandal involving Bill Hybels led to a 36% reduction in revenue for the Willow Creek Association between 2017 and 2018.

Worship Center

Willow Creek's Worship Center (completed in 2004 at an estimated cost of $73 million) seats 7,095 people, making it over twice as large as the Dolby Theatre in Hollywood and one of the largest auditoriums in the United States.

Notable members
 Jimmy Garoppolo, quarterback of the San Francisco 49ers.

Books about Willow Creek Community Church
 
 
 
   330 pp.

References

External links

Willow Creek websites 
  Willow Creek Community Church official website. 
  Willow Creek Association website.

Perspectives and analysis
 .
 .

See also
Me Too movement
Catholic Church sexual abuse cases

Evangelical megachurches in the United States
Evangelical churches in Illinois
Churches in Cook County, Illinois
Christian organizations established in 1975
1975 establishments in Illinois
Non-denominational Evangelical multisite churches
Megachurches in Illinois

vi:Đại giáo đoàn#Nhà thờ Cộng đồng Willow Creek